Chelamma, is a Hindu goddess of the Southern Karnataka region of India.

Chelamma is a Scorpion goddess and is worshipped along with Kolaramma in Kolar.

Followers believe that by praying at the Chelamma shrine a person will be guarded from scorpion bites and  dreaded virus  by the deity. There is an ancient hundi which is carved down into the ground and people have been putting the gifts or Kanike in it from the past 1,000 years and no one has ever opened it.

Legend has it that it contains precious stones and gold coins of bygone times.

The name includes the suffix "amma" which is a common suffix for most South Indian female goddesses. (See Amman)

External links
 Temples of Kolar

Hindu goddesses